Beyond The Valley... is an album by pop-punk band The Queers. It was released in 2000 via Hopeless Records.

Critical reception
Stewart Mason of AllMusic called the album "one of the odder entries in the Queers' extensive catalog," stating that it is "much darker and less overtly funny album than almost anything the band has ever done." Pitchfork Media writer Michael Sandlin criticized the juvenile quality of the songs, but conceded that they are "more cute and melodic than you might expect" and have "some tasty, ass-kicking lead guitar parts . . . the kind that are quickly becoming extinct in modern rock." The Washington Post wrote: "If attacking a 'punk rock snob' in 'Babyface (Boo-Hoo-Hoo)' is fair comment, many of these tracks traffic in misogyny, homophobia and second-rate hooks. The Queers can still bash out a two-minute rocker with vigor, but this album's attitude is tired."

Track listing 
All songs written by Joe Queer, except where noted.
 "Uncouth" (Chris Barrows, Queer) – 1:39
 "Little Rich Working Class Oi-Boy" – 1:39
 "Strangle The Girl" – 2:33
 "I'm Not A Mongo Anymore" – 1:12
 "Stupid Fucking Vegan" (Queer, Wimpy Rutherford) – 1:53
 "In With The Out Crowd" – 2:41
 "I Wanna Know" – 2:13
 "Journey To The Center Of Your Empty Fucking Skull" – 2:17
 "I Hate Your Fucking Guts" – 1:35
 "Babyface (Boo-Hoo-Hoo)" – 3:30
 "My Cunt's A Cunt" – 2:02
 "I Just Called To Say Fuck You" (Queer, Rutherford) – 2:45
 "Just Say Cunt" – 1:37
 "Theme From Beyond The Valley Of The Assfuckers" – 5:10

Personnel 
 Joe Queer - Vocals, Guitar
 Dangerous Dave - Bass, Vocals
 Lurch Nobody - Drums, Vocals
 Joe Brien - Guitar solos on "Oi Boy" and "Babyface (Boo-Hoo-Hoo)"
 Wimpy Rutherford - Vocals on "I Just Called To Say Fuck You" and "Stupid Fucking Vegan"

Notes 

The Queers albums
2000 albums
Hopeless Records albums